Shtick Heads is the second album released by British comedy band The Midnight Beast. The album and its artwork were announced in January 2014 on the band's website, followed by the track listing the next day. The album was released via CD and digital download.

Track listing

Personnel

The Midnight Beast
Stefan James Donald John Abingdon — vocals, guitar, keyboards, songwriting
Ashley Neil Horne — vocals, bass, guitar, songwriting
Andrew Francis Wakely — vocals, drums, songwriting

Additional Personnel
Derek "Sway" Safo — additional vocals on "Sweet Sixteen"
Melanie Martinez — additional vocals on "Sweet Sixteen"
Nova Rockafeller — additional vocals on "#Holiday"
Harry "Cliff Richard" Webb — additional vocals on "#Holiday"
Reginald "Reggie" Watts — additional vocals on "Bass Face"
Sexual P — additional vocals on "Five a Day Flex"
The Hell — additional vocals on "ÜBERCVRRNT (SWAGGERLICIOUSYOLOHELLADOPENESS)"

Charts

References

External links
iTunes - Shtick Heads by The Midnight Beast

2014 albums
The Midnight Beast albums